The Poland women's national beach handball team is the national team of Poland. It is governed by the Poland Handball Federation and takes part in international beach handball competitions.

World Championships results
2012 – 10th place
2016 – 10th place
2018 – 6th place

References

External links
Official website
IHF profile

Beach handball
Women's national beach handball teams
Beach handball